Joshua "Josh" Bostock (born 24 January 1974) is an Australian former professional rugby league footballer who played in the 1990s.

Playing career

First Division Grand Final appearances
Josh Bostock played , i.e. number 5, and scored two tries in Wakefield Trinity's 24-22 victory over Featherstone Rovers in the 1998 First Division Grand Final at McAlpine Stadium, Huddersfield on 26 September 1998.

Club career
Josh Bostock made his début for Wakefield Trinity, played left-, i.e. number 4, and scored 3-tries (a hat-trick) in the 46-28 victory over Rochdale Hornets at Spotland Stadium, Rochdale on Sunday 7 June 1998.

References

External links
Rugby League: Brown Double Decisive

1974 births
Living people
Australian rugby league players
Balmain Tigers players
Oldham R.L.F.C. players
Place of birth missing (living people)
Rugby league centres
Rugby league wingers
Wakefield Trinity players